In phone phreaking, a beige box is a device that is technically equivalent to a telephone company lineman's handset — a telephone fitted with alligator clips to attach it to a line.

Construction

Beige boxes can be usually constructed with easily available materials, such as a simple "POTS" telephone, a soldering iron, and a pair of alligator clips.  Sometimes a switch is added in order to turn the microphone off (mute), so as not to introduce ambient noise into the line through the telephone's microphone.  Green and red wire are the only wires that need connection in order to both talk and listen. Usually this method is done by stripping a portion of the line and attaching alligator clips linked to a corded phone.  Instructions for constructing a beige box can be found in many places on the Internet, as well as instructions on how to make other phreaking boxes.

Alternative beige boxes can also be built by connecting alligator clips to an RJ11 jack. This method does not require modification of a telephone—any kind of telephone that connects to the jack can be used.

The alligator clips on a typical Lineman's handset usually include a part known as a "bed of nails" connector, allowing the clips to be attached to wires without removing their insulation.

History

Although wiretaps go back to the very beginning of telephony, the term "Beige Boxing" has become the generic term for illegally connecting to a phone line.  The first known usage of the term Beige Box by phone phreaks was in a text file released by The Exterminator and The Terminal Man on May 17, 1985.

Legal issues

Although it is not illegal to possess or construct a beige box, it is illegal to use it to make unauthorized use of a phone line with any device, because this violates wiretapping and theft of service laws.  Prior to the 1968 Carterphone decision, a beige box user additionally risked violating AT&T's prohibition on connecting non-AT&T provided equipment to their network.

References

External links
 Original Beige Box
 How To Make a Beige Box

Phreaking boxes